In geometry, the truncated order-4 hexagonal tiling is a uniform tiling of the hyperbolic plane. It has Schläfli symbol of t{6,4}. A secondary construction tr{6,6} is called a truncated hexahexagonal tiling with two colors of dodecagons.

Constructions 
There are two uniform constructions of this tiling, first from [6,4] kaleidoscope, and a lower symmetry by removing the last mirror, [6,4,1+], gives [6,6], (*662).

Dual tiling

Related polyhedra and tiling

Symmetry

The dual of the tiling represents the fundamental domains of (*662) orbifold symmetry.  From [6,6] (*662) symmetry, there are 15 small index subgroup (12 unique) by mirror removal and alternation operators. Mirrors can be removed if its branch orders are all even, and cuts neighboring branch orders in half. Removing two mirrors leaves a half-order gyration point where the removed mirrors met. In these images fundamental domains are alternately colored black and white, and mirrors exist on the boundaries between colors. The subgroup index-8 group, [1+,6,1+,6,1+] (3333) is the commutator subgroup of [6,6].

Larger subgroup constructed as [6,6*], removing the gyration points of (6*3), index 12 becomes (*333333).

The symmetry can be doubled to 642 symmetry by adding a mirror to bisect the fundamental domain.

References
 John H. Conway, Heidi Burgiel, Chaim Goodman-Strauss, The Symmetries of Things 2008,  (Chapter 19, The Hyperbolic Archimedean Tessellations)

See also

Square tiling
Tilings of regular polygons
List of uniform planar tilings
List of regular polytopes

External links 

 Hyperbolic and Spherical Tiling Gallery
 KaleidoTile 3: Educational software to create spherical, planar and hyperbolic tilings
 Hyperbolic Planar Tessellations, Don Hatch

Hexagonal tilings
Hyperbolic tilings
Isogonal tilings
Order-4 tilings
Truncated tilings
Uniform tilings